HMS Redpole (P259) was built in 1974 by Fairmile Marine at Berwick-upon-Tweed as RAFV Sea Otter, the third Seal class Long Range Recovery and Support Craft of the Royal Air Force Marine Branch. The Seal class was similar to the s of the British Royal Navy. .

Royal Naval service
In anticipation of the disbandment of  the RAF Marine Branch in 1986, Sea Otter was transferred to the Royal Navy on 30 October 1984, and at Brooke Marine, Lowestoft she was refitted - given armaments, a light grey livery, enclosed wheelhouse and extended bridge wings, and modified several times over the years to help her in her role patrolling Northern Ireland.

Post-UK service

The ship was sold in 1996, and spent four years tied up in Southampton.  The ship was sold again in 2000 to a founder of Digex, renamed RV Badtz Maru (after Bad Badtz-Maru), and moved to Baltimore, Maryland.

Since 2012 as Seaman Guard Virginia she has participated in anti-piracy patrols conducted by maritime private military contractor AdvanFort in the Gulf of Aden.

References

 

Bird-class patrol vessels
1970 ships